Max Bremner (born 20 April 1963) is a New Zealand cricketer. He played in four first-class and six List A matches for Canterbury in 1987/88.

See also
 List of Canterbury representative cricketers

References

External links
 

1963 births
Living people
New Zealand cricketers
Canterbury cricketers
Cricketers from Dunedin